Itsukushima Shrine (Japanese: Itsukushima-jinja) is a Shinto shrine in Kyoto Gyoen National Garden, Kyoto, Japan.

External links
 

Buildings and structures in Kyoto
Shinto shrines in Japan